Ryndon is an unincorporated community in central Elko County, Nevada, United States.

Description

References

External links
 Ryndon NV News

Unincorporated communities in Elko County, Nevada
Unincorporated communities in Nevada